The 1998–99 Kansas Jayhawks men's basketball team represented the University of Kansas in the 1998–99 NCAA Division I men's basketball season, which was the Jayhawks' 101st basketball season. The head coach was Roy Williams, who served his 11th year at KU. The team played its home games in Allen Fieldhouse in Lawrence, Kansas.

Roster

Big 12 Conference standings

Schedule 

|-

|-

|-
!colspan=9| Big 12 tournament

|-
!colspan=9| NCAA tournament

Rankings 

*There was no coaches poll in week 1.

See also 
 1999 NCAA Division I men's basketball tournament
 1999 Big 12 men's basketball tournament
 1998–99 NCAA Division I men's basketball season

References 

Kansas Jayhawks men's basketball seasons
Kansas
Jay
Jay
Kansas